The 1927 Kansas State Agricultural College Wildcats football team represented Kansas State Agricultural College in the 1927 college football season.

Schedule

References

Kansas State
Kansas State Wildcats football seasons
Kansas State Wildcats football